Remo Sansonetti (born 24 January 1946) is an Australian former cyclist. He competed at the 1972, 1976 and 1980 Summer Olympics. Sansonetti set the fastest time in the amateur Goulburn to Sydney Classic in 1979 run from Goulburn to Liverpool. He is a twin brother of Sal Sansonetti. The Sansonettis produced the bikes for the Australian team.

References

External links
 

1946 births
Living people
Australian male cyclists
Olympic cyclists of Australia
Cyclists at the 1972 Summer Olympics
Cyclists at the 1976 Summer Olympics
Cyclists at the 1980 Summer Olympics
People from L'Aquila
Commonwealth Games medallists in cycling
Commonwealth Games silver medallists for Australia
Commonwealth Games bronze medallists for Australia
Australian track cyclists
Cyclists at the 1974 British Commonwealth Games
Cyclists at the 1982 Commonwealth Games
Sportspeople from the Province of L'Aquila
Cyclists from Abruzzo
Italian emigrants to Australia
Medallists at the 1974 British Commonwealth Games
Medallists at the 1982 Commonwealth Games